Denmark sent a delegation to the 1968 Summer Paralympics in Tel Aviv, Israel, from November 4 to 13, 1968. 
Eight Danish athletes competed, seven men and one woman. The team did not win any medals.

See also 
 Denmark at the 1968 Summer Olympics

Notes

References

Nations at the 1968 Summer Paralympics
1968
Paralympics